E minor is a minor scale based on E, consisting of the pitches E, F, G, A, B, C, and D. Its key signature has one sharp. Its relative major is G major and its parallel major is E major.

The E natural minor scale is:

Changes needed for the melodic and harmonic versions of the scale are written in with accidentals as necessary. The E harmonic minor and melodic minor scales are:

Much of the classical guitar repertoire is in E minor, as this is a very natural key for the instrument. In standard tuning (E A D G B E), four of the instrument's six open (unfretted) strings are part of the tonic chord. The key of E minor is also popular in heavy metal music, as its tonic is the lowest note on a standard-tuned guitar.

Notable compositions

Joseph Haydn
Symphony No. 44 (Trauer)
Wolfgang Amadeus Mozart
Violin Sonata No. 21
Ludwig van Beethoven
 String Quartet No. 8
 Piano Sonata No. 27
Niccolò Paganini
Caprice No. 3
Caprice No. 15
Felix Mendelssohn
Violin Concerto
Frédéric Chopin
Nocturne in E minor
Piano Concerto No. 1
Waltz in E minor
Étude Op. 25, No. 5 "Wrong Note"
Prelude Op. 28, No. 4 "Suffocation"
Charles-Valentin Alkan
 Le festin d'Ésope, Op. 39, No. 12, from 12 etudes in all the minor keys
Johannes Brahms
Symphony No. 4
Cello Sonata No. 1
Pyotr Ilyich Tchaikovsky
Symphony No. 5
Antonín Dvořák
Symphony No. 9 (From the New World)
Slavonic Dance No. 2, Op. 46
Slavonic Dance No. 2, Op. 72
Edvard Grieg
Piano Sonata
Nikolai Rimsky-Korsakov
Scheherazade
Edward Elgar
Cello Concerto
Sea Pictures
String Quartet
Violin Sonata
Jean Sibelius
Symphony No. 1, Op. 39
Ralph Vaughan Williams
Symphony No. 6
Symphony No. 9

Sergei Rachmaninoff
Moments musicaux, Op. 16, No. 4
Symphony No. 2
Vocalise, Op. 34, No. 14
Maurice Ravel
Le tombeau de Couperin
Sergei Prokofiev
Montagues and Capulets
Dmitri Shostakovich
Piano Trio No. 2
Symphony No. 10
Johann Sebastian Bach
Bourrée in E minor, BWV 996
Prelude and Fugue in E minor, BWV 548
 Partita for keyboard in E minor, BWV 830

See also
Key (music)
Major and minor
Chord (music)
Chord notation

External links

Musical keys
Minor scales